Ercheia bergeri is a species of moth of the family Erebidae. It is found in Madagascar.

References

Moths described in 1968
Ercheiini
Moths of Africa